Abdoulaye Keita (born 16 August 1990) is a French footballer who plays as a goalkeeper for Vendée Fontenay Foot.

Career
Born in Clichy-la-Garenne, Keita began his career 2006 in the youth side for FC Girondins de Bordeaux and made his first team debut against Paris Saint-Germain on 10 April 2010 in the Ligue 1.

International career
He is former French international Under-17 and under 19 player, he played the 2007 FIFA U-17 World Cup, where he made three appearances.

References

External links
 

Living people
1990 births
French footballers
Association football goalkeepers
FC Girondins de Bordeaux players
French sportspeople of Malian descent
Ligue 1 players
People from Clichy, Hauts-de-Seine
Footballers from Hauts-de-Seine